The three teams in this group played against each other on a home-and-away basis. The group winner Czechoslovakia qualified for the sixth FIFA World Cup held in Sweden.

Wales were drawn to play against Israel in a special play-off.

Table

Matches

References

External links
FIFA official page
RSSSF - 1958 World Cup Qualification
Allworldcup

4
1956–57 in Welsh football
qual
1956–57 in Czechoslovak football
Qual
1957 in East German football